The West Coast Fossil Park is a fossil park near Langebaanweg, Western Cape, South Africa, approximately  north of Cape Town. The fossil sites of Langebaanweg have exceptionally well-preserved remains of fossil fauna that date to circa 5.2 million years ago.  In this period sea levels were higher and many now extinct animals lived in the riverine forests, wooded savanna and along the sea coast near the present day Langebaanweg site. Phosphate mining operations at Langebaanweg uncovered these rich fossil deposits. The fossils include bones of over 200 different animal species. This represents possibly the greatest diversity of five-million-year-old fossils found anywhere in the world. The fossil park was formed after mining operations ceased in 1993. The park is partnered with the Iziko South African Museum.

In 1996 the former National Monuments Council declared the site a national monument.  With the introduction of the National Heritage Resources Act in 2000 it became a provincial heritage site and in March 2012 the provincial heritage resources authority, Heritage Western Cape significantly expanded the area that is protected.

References

External links
 Official homepage
 National Heritage Resources Act 25 of 1999
 Heritage Western Cape website

Pliocene paleontological sites of Africa
Fossil parks
Geologic formations of Africa
South African heritage resources
South African heritage sites
Geology of South Africa
Paleontology in South Africa
1996 in paleontology
2000 in paleontology